Pierre-Alexis Pessonneaux (born 25 November 1987) is a French sprinter who specialises in the 200 metres. He helped the French men's 4 x 100 metres relay team to the gold medal at the 2010 European Athletics Championships. At the 2012 Summer Olympics, Pessonneaux was part of France's 4 × 100 m relay team that claimed the bronze medal.

Personal best

References

External links

France’s Vicaut shows off Moncton medal credentials

1987 births
Living people
French male sprinters
Athletes (track and field) at the 2012 Summer Olympics
Olympic athletes of France
Olympic bronze medalists for France
Medalists at the 2012 Summer Olympics
European Athletics Championships medalists
Université Savoie-Mont Blanc alumni
Olympic bronze medalists in athletics (track and field)
Mediterranean Games silver medalists for France
Athletes (track and field) at the 2009 Mediterranean Games
Mediterranean Games medalists in athletics
20th-century French people
21st-century French people